The Adventures of Superman was a six-part radio drama commissioned by BBC Radio 4 and broadcast in 1988.

Synopsis
In the late eighties Superman was adapted for BBC Radio 4 in the form of a one off docudrama called Superman On Trial. Due to the huge success of this and its sequel Batman: The Lazarus Syndrome, the BBC commissioned a six-part radio drama The Adventures of Superman it would run for two series and have both a cassette and CD release.

Superman On Trial

First broadcast: 1988

Written to celebrate Superman's 50th birthday. Accused of crimes against humanity, the last son of Krypton stands powerless before a court dominated by Lex Luthor – criminal genius turned prosecutor. Has Superman really corrupted our children? Can he justify his continued interference in world affairs? Do we know the truth about his powers? Can Lois Lane defend '50 years of the Man of Steel'? Packed with spectacular sound effects and a thrilling orchestral score, mixed in cinematic Dolby Surround.

1988 radio programme debuts
1988 radio programme endings
BBC Radio 4 programmes
Superman radio series
British radio dramas
British science fiction radio programmes